Operation Northern Falcon is a joint Ukrainian–Danish operation in Greenland for the transportation of fuel from the United States Air Force's Thule Air Base to the Danish Station Nord by the military transport aircraft Ilyushin Il-76MD of the Ukrainian Air Force. It has been conducted annually since 2009.

History

The operation has been conducted for ten years in a row as part of the memorandum of understanding between the Ukrainian and Danish defence ministries.

Operation Northern Falcon 2011 involved 29 Ukrainian servicemen. Two flight crews, led by commanders Guard Lieutenant Colonel Vadym Yeroshkin and Vlodymyr Buhalskyi, engineering staff of the airlift brigade of the Ukrainian Air Force, deployed in Melitopol. Also, the working group included officers-coordinators of the Ukrainian Air Force Command.

On 14 March 2019, Operation Northern Falcon 2019 on fuel transportation to the island of Greenland began and lasted until April that year. In the framework of the operation, a group of Ukrainian aviators, with Colonel Serhii Artemenko as a Detachment Commander, has left Ukraine from the military platform of Boryspil International Airport to the Kingdom of Denmark by the aircraft Il-76MD. In general, 23 Ukrainian servicemen were involved in the operation. After arriving at Aalborg Air Base of the Royal Danish Air Force, the aircraft Il-76MD of the Ukrainian Air Force went to the island of Greenland. It was planned to transport 700 thousand liters of fuel and other cargo from the United States Air Force's Thule Air Base to the Danish Station Nord.

In Greenland, Ukrainian military pilots perform tasks in difficult Arctic climatic conditions: −50 °C air temperature, wind speed of 15–20 metres per second and without ground-based radio navigation equipment and spare airfields.

See also
 Denmark–Ukraine relations

References

Denmark–Ukraine relations
Military in the Arctic
Military of Denmark
Northern Falcon
Northern Falcon
Ukrainian Air Force